Henry Fownes Luttrell (7 February 1790 – 6 October 1867) was an English lawyer and Tory politician from Dunster Castle in Somerset. He sat in the House of Commons of the United Kingdom from 1816 to 1822.

Fownes Luttrell was the second surviving son of John Fownes Luttrell I (1752–1816). His mother Mary was a daughter of Francis Drewe of The Grange, Broadhembury, Devon. He was educated at Eton and at Brasenose College, Oxford, and called to the bar at the Middle Temple in 1813.

His father died on 16 February 1816, and on 12 March Henry was elected unopposed to his father's parliamentary seat as Member of Parliament (MP) for Minehead. The seat was a pocket borough which had been dominated since the 16th century by the Luttrell family, who owned the feudal barony of Dunster. Successive generations of Lutrells had used the borough to elect themselves and their allies or paying guests, and Fownes Luttrell's older brother John Fownes Luttrell II had held the borough's second seat since 1812.

The Fownes Luttrell brothers were re-elected unopposed in 1818 and 1820,
but Henry resigned his seat in 1822 to become a Commissioner of the Board of Audit.

His brother John died in 1857, when Henry succeeded to the Dunster Castle estates which John had inherited from their father's estate.

Henry died unmarried on 6 October 1867, aged 77.

See also 
 Feudal barony of Dunster

References 
 

1790 births
1867 deaths
Henry Fownes
People educated at Eton College
Alumni of Brasenose College, Oxford
Members of the Middle Temple
Tory MPs (pre-1834)
Members of the Parliament of the United Kingdom for English constituencies
UK MPs 1812–1818
UK MPs 1818–1820
UK MPs 1820–1826
Politicians from Somerset
English barristers